The Best of Porter Wagoner & Dolly Parton is a compilation album by Porter Wagoner and Dolly Parton. It was released on July 19, 1971, by RCA Victor. The album contains tracks from each of their collaboration albums released up to that point, with the exception of 1969's Always, Always. The album included one previously unreleased track, the Grammy-nominated single, "Better Move It on Home".

Critical reception

The review in the July 31, 1971 issue of Billboard said, "This collection of the best performances by Porter Wagoner and Dolly Parton is sure to prove a blockbuster programming and sales item. Their top treatments of "Daddy Was an Old Time Preacher Man", "The Pain of Loving You", "The Last Thing on My Mind", and "Just Someone I Used to Know" are standouts."

Cashbox published a review in the July 24, 1971 issue which said, "One whole lot of sales power in this album from a duo that consistently hits the charts together and apart. The most recent hit here included is "Better Move It on Home" while other titles will be equally familiar to their large following: "Just Someone I Used to Know", "The Pain of Loving You", and "Holding on to Nothin'" just to mention a few. A musical marriage made in country heaven."

Reviewing in Christgau's Record Guide: Rock Albums of the Seventies, Robert Christgau wrote: "There are real pleasures here, but they're chiefly vocal. The surprises are few, the jokes weak and infrequent, the sentimentality overripe ("Jeanie's Afraid of the Dark", yeucch), and the best song's by Paxton, nor Parton. In short, a lousy ad for couple-bonding, though whether Porter is repressing Dolly or Dolly holding out on Porter I wouldn't know."

Commercial performance
The album peaked at No. 7 on the US Billboard Hot Country LP's chart.

The album's single, "Better Move It on Home", was released in January 1971 and peaked at No. 7 on the US Billboard Hot Country Singles chart and No. 8 in Canada on the RPM Country Singles chart.

Accolades
The album's single, "Better Move It on Home", was nominated for Best Country Vocal Performance by a Duo or Group at the 14th Annual Grammy Awards.

Track listing

Personnel
Adapted from the album liner notes.
Bob Ferguson – producer
Les Leverett – cover photo
Jim Malloy – recording engineer
Al Pachucki – recording engineer
Chuck Seitz – recording engineer
Roy Shockley – recording technician
Paul W. Soelberg – liner notes

Charts
Album

Singles

Release history

References

Porter Wagoner albums
Albums produced by Bob Ferguson (music)
Vocal duet albums
1971 greatest hits albums
Dolly Parton compilation albums
RCA Records compilation albums